The Prowler is a 1951 American film noir thriller film directed by Joseph Losey that stars Van Heflin and Evelyn Keyes. The film was produced by Sam Spiegel (as S.P. Eagle) and was written by Dalton Trumbo. Because Trumbo was blacklisted at the time, the screenplay was credited to his friend, screenwriter Hugo Butler, as a front.

Plot
Webb Garwood, a disgruntled cop, is called to investigate a report of a peeping tom by Susan Gilvray, whose husband works nights as a radio personality. Webb falls in love with the young and attractive married woman. Obsessed, he woos her and, despite her initial reluctance, they begin an adulterous affair.

After Webb discovers Susan's husband has a life insurance policy, he concocts a scheme to cash in. One night, he makes noise outside Susan's house which suggests a prowler is nearby again. After he leaves, he hears the subsequent complaint reported from Susan's address in his police car. He returns to the house in his official capacity and again makes noise indicating a prowler. When Susan's husband comes outside armed, Webb — hiding in the bushes — kills him with his service revolver. Webb then wounds himself with the husband's pistol to make it appear the two had exchanged gunfire.

Webb's ruse fools a coroner's jury, partly because he and Susan testify that they did not know each other before her husband's death (although Webb's police partner knows otherwise).

At first Susan suspects Webb of foul play, but he convinces her of his innocence, and later, marries her. Shortly after the wedding, Susan informs Webb that she is four months pregnant.  Since her husband was infertile, she knows that Webb is the baby's father. The date of the baby's conception would prove that they lied in their testimonies to hide their previous relationship; it also would suggest that Webb's killing of Susan's husband was intentional.

Webb and Susan flee to Calico, a ghost town, for the baby to be born without anyone back home knowing. They enjoy a happy life until Susan goes into premature labor. Webb drives to a nearby town and forces Dr. William James to come to Calico to help with the birth. Susan realizes that Webb intends to kill Dr. James to preserve their secret, so she warns the doctor, who escapes with the newborn, and Webb's Cadillac keys.

Susan tells Webb that she knows he intended to kill the doctor and that he intentionally murdered her husband. Realizing the doctor will send the police after him, Webb drives away, using the car's spare keys a disgusted Susan at first hid, and then threw on the floor, leaving Susan alone in Calico.

Webb finds the narrow track out of town blocked by his former police partner, who is paying him a surprise visit. While desperately trying to push his friend's reversing car with his own car's front bumper, Webb sees two police cars approaching so he heads for the hills on foot. After he refuses orders to surrender, a sheriff's deputy shoots him from afar. Webb was proud of his sharpshooting, but there's always someone equally good, or better.

Cast
 Van Heflin as Webb Garwood
 Evelyn Keyes as Susan Gilvray
 John Maxwell as Bud Crocker
 Katherine Warren as Grace Crocker
 Emerson Treacy as William Gilvray
 Madge Blake as Martha Gilvray
 Wheaton Chambers as Dr. William James
 Robert Osterloh as Coroner
 Louise Lorimer as Motel Manager
 Sherry Hall as John Gilvray
 Herbert Anderson as Reporter (uncredited)
 Dalton Trumbo as radio voice of John Gilvray (uncredited)

Restoration
Since The Prowler was produced independently, there was no studio to help preserve it and it was considered "orphaned." After a time, there was only one print left, and this was deteriorating.  However, the Film Noir Foundation and the UCLA Film and Television Archive partnered to restore the film.

Hollywood Blacklist
Several crew members of The Prowler were adversely affected by the Hollywood Blacklist. Screenplay writer Dalton Trumbo, a member of the Hollywood 10, was forced to write under a pseudonym, using the name Hugo Butler, a friend of his. Butler would soon be blacklisted too, writing in exile for twelve years and using pseudonyms himself.  In a twist of irony and a dig at censors, director Joseph Losey cast Trumbo as the voice of the radio DJ, John Gilvray. Losey would also be blacklisted shortly after directing the movie.

Production
Evelyn Keyes, under contract at Columbia, had long complained about the lack of challenging roles offered to her. When Sam Spiegel of Horizon Pictures (producers of the film for United Artists) bought this story, his partner at Horizon, John Huston, thought it would the perfect project for Keyes, his estranged wife. Although more famous for her role in Gone with the Wind, Keyes felt this to be the best role and best performance of her career.  Of those working on the film, only Spiegel, Houston, and Losey knew that the screenwriter was the blacklisted Dalton Trumbo.

Reception

Critical response
Critical reception for the film has been mostly positive. The Prowler holds a 100% rating on Rotten Tomatoes based on eighteen reviews.

In a contemporary review, The New York Times noted "an impressive drama."

Film critic Dennis Schwartz liked the film, writing, "A neat noir thriller that has a slight variation on the Double Indemnity theme, this time it is the guy who is the seducer. This is a Joseph Losey American film, made before his self-exile from the 1950s HUAC witch hunt days when he fled to England. It is the director's aim to highlight social issues and class differences. They will play a major role in the motif, adding to the usual noir ones of dark character and sexual misconduct. Dalton Trumbo, the blacklisted writer, is the uncredited co-writer of the script."

Leonard Maltin awarded the film 3 out of a possible 4 stars, praising its camerawork and production design and calling the film "unusually nasty and utterly unpredictable".

References

External links
 
 
 
 
 The Prowler informational site and DVD review at DVD Beaver (includes images)
 
 The Prowler full length on YouTube

1951 films
1950s psychological thriller films
Adultery in films
American black-and-white films
American psychological thriller films
1950s English-language films
Film noir
Films directed by Joseph Losey
Films produced by Sam Spiegel
Films scored by Lyn Murray
Films set in Los Angeles
Films set in the Las Vegas Valley
Films with screenplays by Dalton Trumbo
United Artists films
1950s American films